Ropica sparsepunctata is a species of beetle in the family Cerambycidae. It was described by Breuning in 1940. It is known from Borneo.

References

sparsepunctata
Beetles described in 1940